Arp 302 (also known as Exclamation Point Galaxy) is a galaxy in the constellation Boötes. Arp 302, also known as VV 340 or UGC 9618 consists of a pair of very gas-rich spiral galaxies in their early stages of interaction. An enormous amount of infrared light is radiated by the gas from massive stars that are forming at a rate similar to the most vigorous giant star-forming regions in our own Milky Way. Arp 302 is 450 million light-years away from Earth, and is the 302nd galaxy in Arp's Atlas of Peculiar Galaxies.

Gallery

References

External links
 

Boötes
09618
53432
Interacting galaxies
Luminous infrared galaxies
302
Articles containing video clips